Christophorus III (K'ristep'ore III) (27 March 1873 – 10 January 1932) was a Catholicos-Patriarch of All Georgia from 1927 until his death.

He was born as Kristepore Tsitskishvili (ქრისტეფორე ციცქიშვილი) near the town of Kharagauli. Having graduated from the Tbilisi Spiritual Seminary in 1895, he served as a priest in the Trans-Caspian region, and later in Georgia. At the same time, he taught theology and Georgian, and was energetically involved in the movement which led to the restoration of autocephaly of the Georgian Orthodox Church in 1917. Christophorus was consecrated as a bishop of Urbnisi (1921–1925) and metropolitan of Abkhazia (1925–1927). Elected as the catholicos-patriarch on 4 June 1927, he had to lead the Georgian church as it withstood harsh pressure from the Soviet authorities.

References
 Catholicoi and Patriarchs of Georgia. Orthodoxy.Ge

1873 births
1932 deaths
Catholicoses and Patriarchs of Georgia (country)
Eastern Orthodox Christians from Georgia (country)
People from Kutais Governorate